Crescent Lake is a freshwater lake located in Waterford Township, Michigan. It borders Elizabeth Lake Rd. The 90-acres lake has a maximum depth of 40 feet.

Crescent Lake is connected to Elizabeth Lake.

Crescent Lake's name is derived from the lake's crescent shape.

Fish
Fish in Crescent Lake include black crappie, bluegill, largemouth bass, northern pike, rock bass, sunfish and walleye.

References

Geography of Oakland County, Michigan
Lakes of Oakland County, Michigan
Lakes of Michigan
Lakes of Waterford Township, Michigan